The Man in the Saddle (German:Der Mann im Sattel) is a 1925 German silent film directed by Manfred Noa. It was remade as a sound film of the same title starring Harry Piel.

The film's sets were designed by Artur Günther.

Cast
In alphabetical order
 Colette Darfeuil 
 Wilhelm Diegelmann 
 Angelo Ferrari 
 Paul Graetz as Manager  
 Harry Hardt 
 Francine Mussey 
 Heinrich Peer 
 F.W. Schröder-Schrom 
 Ernő Verebes as Mann im Sattel  
 Kurt Wolowsky

References

Bibliography
 Bock, Hans-Michael & Bergfelder, Tim. The Concise CineGraph. Encyclopedia of German Cinema. Berghahn Books, 2009.

External links

1925 films
Films of the Weimar Republic
Films directed by Manfred Noa
German silent feature films
German horse racing films
UFA GmbH films
German black-and-white films
1920s German films
1920s German-language films